Broadbent sign is a clinical sign in which the 11th and 12th ribs are indrawn, with narrowing of the intercostal space posteriorly, which is seen in case adhesive pericarditis due to pericardial adhesions to the diaphragm.

The sign is named after Walter Broadbent, and was published in his first paper in 1895, although it may have been inspired by his father, Sir William Broadbent.

References 

Medical signs
Cardiology